is a Japanese badminton player.

Achievements

BWF International Challenge/Series (4 titles, 1 runner-up) 
Women's doubles

  BWF International Challenge tournament
  BWF International Series tournament
  BWF Future Series tournament

References

External links 
 

Japanese female badminton players
1996 births
Living people
Sportspeople from Fukuoka Prefecture